V. Saminathan is an Indian politician and member of the Bharatiya Janata Party. He's currently a president of Pondicherry BJP. Saminathan is a member of the Puducherry Legislative Assembly from 4 July 2017 as a Nominated by Central Government of India.

V Saminathan serving BJP from last 1990s and he is the seniormost of BJP Pondicherry, He elected as BJP Pondicherry State President three times.He's a prominent leader in Puducherry belongs Sengunthar.He is a Popular Neta from Lawspet constituency,Puducherry. He contested 2016 Puducherry Legislative Assembly election from Lawspet constituency and got 8,891 votes. He is the current President of BJP Puducherry unit.

References 

Living people
Year of birth missing (living people)
21st-century Indian politicians
People from Puducherry
Bharatiya Janata Party politicians from Puducherry
Puducherry MLAs 2016–2021
Puducherry politicians
Nominated members of the Puducherry Legislative Assembly